This article concerns the orders and decorations of the Commonwealth realms awarded by the sovereign in right of each nation.

Awards are listed by order of wear.

Antigua and Barbuda
 Order of the National Hero
 Order of the Nation
 Order of Merit
 Order of Princely Heritage

Australia
 Order of Australia

The Bahamas
 The Order of National Hero
 The Order of the Nation
 The Order of The Bahamas
 The Order of Excellence
 The Order of Distinction
 The Order of Merit
 The Order of Lignum Vitae

Belize
Order of the National Hero 
Order of Belize
Order of Distinction

Canada
 Order of Canada
 Order of Military Merit
 Order of Merit of the Police Forces

Grenada
Order of the National Hero
Order of Grenada

Jamaica
 Order of National Hero
 Order of the Nation
 Order of Excellence
 Order of Merit
 Order of Jamaica
 Order of Distinction

New Zealand
 Order of New Zealand
 New Zealand Order of Merit
 Queen's Service Order

Papua New Guinea

Order of Logohu
Order of the Star of Melanesia

Solomon Islands
 Order of the Solomon Islands

St. Christopher and Nevis
 Order of St Christopher and Nevis
 Order of the National Hero

Saint Lucia
 Order of Saint Lucia

Tuvalu
Tuvalu Order of Merit

United Kingdom
 Order of the Garter
 Order of the Thistle
 Order of the Bath
 Order of Merit
 Order of St Michael and St George
 Royal Victorian Order
 Order of the British Empire
 Order of the Companions of Honour
 Distinguished Service Order
 Imperial Service Order
 Royal Victorian Chain

Former

Barbados
 Order of Barbados

See also 
 Orders, decorations, and medals of Australia
 Australian Honours Order of Precedence
 Orders, decorations, and medals of Canada
 Canadian order of precedence (decorations and medals)
 Fijian honours system
 Jamaican honours system
 Orders, decorations, and medals of New Zealand
 New Zealand Honours Order of Precedence
 Orders, decorations, and medals of Papua New Guinea
 Orders, decorations, and medals of the United Kingdom
 United Kingdom order of precedence
 Good Conduct stripe
 List of post-nominal letters
 The Society of the Friends of St George's and Descendants of the Knights of the Garter

References

External links 
 New Zealand Honours—Order of Wear
 Guide to the Position of Letters after the Name

Commonwealth realms
.
.
Post-nominal letters